Ladian is a small village in Kharian Tehsil, Gujrat District, Punjab, Pakistan. It is known for its brave son Maj. Raja Aziz Bhatti Shaheed (Nishan-e-Haider). It is located at 30°59'0N 72°51'0E and has an altitude of 156 metres (512 feet).

Most of the population of the village belongs to the Rajput Gujjar and Jat castes. The other prevailing casts are Bhatti & Kashmiri. The Haqlay, Mehar, Ladi, mians, Padhanas, Kharis, Chandi are the sub casts of Gujjars. The name of the village is in reference to Ladi cast. It is believed that Ladis built this village and other casts later migrated in.

Agricultural gains are the mainstay of economy. Different types of corps are cultivated throughout the entire year.

Education 

Literacy Rate of the village is 40%. Most of the people are settled in European, America & Arab countries. Every year on 6 September, a very graceful army parade is conducted. The only road is from Kharin to Kotla Arab Ali Khan. This road has an important role from a defence point of view, as this road connects the main cantonment to the border area towards Azad Kashmir.

The village has 4 Schools & one Rural health Dispensary serving the people. The special contribution of Mr.Sardar Bhatti  in education is highly appreciated to improve the education standards. Beaconhouse school system and other good schools are also in the vicinity of 25 minutes drive from the village. Main G.T Road connecting Islamabad and Lahore is about 40 minutes drive from the village.

Neighborhood 
Some of the important towns in the vicinity are: Guliyana, Lalamusa, Kharian, Bhurach Basoha, Gujrat, Bhimber, Azad Kashmir, Kotla Arab Ali Khan Kakrali.

Sports 
Cricket & Volleyball are popular games in youngsters. The youngsters are enthusiastic & energetic to explore Europe & America.

References

Villages in Kharian Tehsil